Karen Chen (born August 16, 1999) is an American figure skater. She is a 2022 Olympic Games team event silver medalist, two-time CS U.S. Classic bronze medalist (2016, 2017), the 2015 CS Golden Spin of Zagreb bronze medalist, the 2017 U.S. national champion, 2022 U.S. national silver medalist, and a three-time U.S. national bronze medalist (2015, 2018, 2021). She is currently a student at Cornell University. 

Chen also competed at the 2018 Winter Olympics, placing 11th. She has competed at seven ISU Championships, achieving her best result, fourth, at two World Championships (2017, 2021).

Earlier in her career, she won four medals on the ISU Junior Grand Prix series, including gold at the 2013 JGP Slovakia.

Personal life 
Karen Chen was born on August 16, 1999 in Fremont, California to Hsiu-Hui Tseng and Chih-Hsiu Chen. Her parents moved to the United States from Taiwan. She has a younger brother, Jeffrey, who also competes for the U.S. in ice dance. She was homeschooled via Connections Academy in high school. Chen has expressed interest in majoring in the medical field. She was admitted to Cornell University's School of Human Ecology as part of the class of 2023 and will major in Human Biology, Health and Society on a pre-med track. Chen originally did not plan to take any gap years or defer her education while preparing for the 2022 Winter Olympics, but decided to take a two-year leave of absence after the onset of the COVID-19 pandemic.

Chen's mentor is 1992 Olympic Champion Kristi Yamaguchi, who shares a hometown with her. Chen published a memoir titled Finding the Edge: My Life on the Ice in November 2017, in which she revealed that she suffers from spondylolisthesis. Chen enjoys painting and is a fan of the Japanese character Totoro. On 2019 International Women's Day, she was chosen to be one of eight POWERGIRLs that serve as brand ambassadors for social fitness blogger Cassey Ho's activewear company, POPFLEX Active.

Career

Early career 
Chen began learning to skate in 2005. She won gold on the national intermediate level in 2011 and then gold competing as a novice in 2012. The following season, she competed on the junior level at the 2013 U.S. Championships, placing fourth. She made her international debut at the 2013 Gardena Spring Trophy, where she won gold on the novice level.

2013–14 season: Junior international debut 

In the 2013–14 season, Chen received her first ISU Junior Grand Prix (JGP) assignments. She won bronze in Riga, Latvia, followed by gold in Košice, Slovakia, and qualified for the JGP Final. While practicing a triple Lutz, she sustained a type three tibia fracture in her right ankle. The injury led her to withdraw from the JGP Final. Chen spent four weeks on crutches and resumed training in mid-December. She withdrew from the junior event at the 2014 U.S. Championships after placing fifth in the short program. At the 2014 World Junior Championships in Sofia, Bulgaria, she placed sixth in the short program, ninth in the free skate, and ninth overall.

2014–15 season: First senior national medal 
In the 2014–15 JGP series, Chen won bronze at Czech Skate and silver at the Croatia Cup, respectively. She was awarded the bronze medal in her senior national debut at the 2015 U.S. Championships, behind Ashley Wagner and Gracie Gold. Chen was not old enough to compete at the 2015 World Figure Skating Championships and was instead assigned to the 2015 World Junior Figure Skating Championships, where she placed eighth.

2015–16 season: Senior international debut 
Ahead of the season, Chen tried 14 pairs of skate boots. In September 2015, she finished fourth at the 2015 U.S. International Classic, an ISU Challenger Series (CS) event and her first senior international. Making her Grand Prix debut, she placed fifth at both the 2015 Skate America and 2015 Cup of China. She won bronze at her second CS assignment, the 2015 Golden Spin of Zagreb in December and finished 8th at the 2016 U.S. Championships in January.

2016–17 season: Senior national champion 

Chen began her season at the 2016 CS U.S. Classic, placing third behind Japan's Satoko Miyahara and the United States' Mariah Bell.

On the Grand Prix series, Chen achieved a seventh-place finish at 2016 Cup of China and a sixth-place finish at 2016 NHK Trophy.

Chen won the gold medal at the 2017 U.S. Championships after placing first in both the short program and free skate. She set a new U.S. record with her short program score of 72.82.

At the 2017 Four Continents Championships, Chen skated to a twelfth-place finish.

Chen rebounded at the 2017 World Figure Skating Championships, placing fifth in the short program with a score of 69.98. She then placed sixth in the free program with a score of 129.31. With a combined score of 199.29, Chen skated to a fourth-place finish overall in her first appearance at the World Championships. Her placement, combined with a seventh-place finish from teammate Ashley Wagner, qualified Team USA three spots for the 2018 Olympics and 2018 World Figure Skating Championships.

2017–18 season: Pyeongchang Olympics 

Chen began her season at the CS's U.S. International Figure Skating Classic, placing 3rd overall for the second year in a row. Before beginning competition in her Grand Prix series, Chen also performed a free skate at the Japan Open helping Team North America earn the bronze medal with a 6th-place finish.

Two weeks before her first Grand Prix event, Chen abandoned her "Carmen"-themed free skate program and replaced it with a program she choreographed herself, including music from the 1978 film Slow Dancing in the Big City. With her new program, Chen placed 7th overall at the 2017 Skate Canada International.

Chen competed in her second Grand Prix event at 2017 Skate America and placed ninth in the short program after failing to land a triple loop. She improved to eighth place after the free skating, from which teammate Ashley Wagner withdrew due to an ankle infection.

At the 2018 U.S. Championships, Chen placed third in the short program and fourth in the free skate to win the overall bronze medal. As a result, Chen was selected to represent the US at the 2018 Winter Olympic Games in Pyeongchang, South Korea and the 2018 World Championships in Milan, Italy. She placed eleventh in the Olympics and withdrew from Worlds; she was replaced by second alternate Mariah Bell after first alternate Ashley Wagner declined the invitation.

2018–19 season: Injury and withdrawals 
Chen trained with her younger brother, ice dancer Jeffrey Chen, in Canton, Michigan during the two-month-long 2018 Stars on Ice tour. She later relocated with longtime coach Tammy Gambill from Riverside, California to Gambill's new training base at the United States Olympic Training Center in Colorado Springs, Colorado over the summer. Chen will also work with coaches Christy Krall and Tom Zakrajsek in addition to Gambill.

Chen withdrew from early season events and her Grand Prix assignments, 2018 Grand Prix of Helsinki and 2018 Rostelecom Cup, following an injury during the off-season. She returned to competition at the 2018 CS Tallinn Trophy, where she finished ninth in the short program. Chen withdrew from the free skate due to injury. She announced her subsequent withdrawal from the 2019 U.S. Championships to focus on her health in early January. Chen later revealed that she had been suffering from a stress fracture in her right foot. In 2019, she also announced that she would be attending Cornell University in the fall, as well as returning to competition during the 2019–20 season.

2019–20 season: Comeback year 
Chen returned to competition after sitting out the 2018–19 season due to injury while simultaneously beginning her freshman year at Cornell University. She opened her season at the 2019 Philadelphia Summer International, where she won the silver medal behind training teammate You Young of South Korea. Chen then placed fourth at the 2019 CS Autumn Classic International in Oakville, Ontario behind Rika Kihira, Evgenia Medvedeva, and Lim Eun-soo.

At her first Grand Prix event of the season and first major international event since the 2018 Olympic Games, 2019 Skate America, Chen placed sixth in the short program and tenth in the free skate to finish eighth overall while battling a cold and sleep deprivation. She told media that despite her struggles balancing school and skating, “I do really enjoy everything and I think I made the right decision.” At the 2019 NHK Trophy, Chen placed third in the short program ahead of reigning Olympic champion Alina Zagitova of Russia but struggled in the free skate to finish ninth overall.

Before the 2020 U.S. Championships, Chen worked with choreographer Ilona Melnichenko to bring back the Slow Dancing in the Big City free skating program that she previously debuted and competed once at 2017 Skate Canada. She placed fifth in the short program and fourth in the free skating to finish fourth at the U.S. Championships, behind Alysa Liu, Mariah Bell, and Bradie Tennell, despite not completing a triple-triple combination in either program. Her pewter is the fourth medal that she has won at the senior level. As a result of her placement and Liu being age-ineligible for senior competition, Chen was named to the U.S. team for the 2020 Four Continents Championships. She was also named as first alternate for the 2020 World Championships.

Chen earned personal bests in all three segments to achieve a seventh-place finish at 2020 Four Continents Championships, her highest ever after previously placing 12th twice. She told the media after her free skate, "I am proud of myself for the last competition of the season. Ending on a high note is exactly what I wanted to do."

2020–21 season: Return to Worlds 
Chen did not enroll at Cornell for her sophomore year, explaining that classes meeting only virtually meant "it wasn’t worth paying full tuition and not having the whole college experience," and instead returned to training full-time in Colorado Springs. Due to the COVID-19 pandemic, the ISU opted to make assignments for the Grand Prix based on training location to minimize international travel; Chen was correspondingly assigned to compete at 2020 Skate America. She placed fourth in the short program, underrotating the triple toe loop in her jump combination. She was second in the free skate but remained in fourth place overall. Shortly after that, she competed in the 2020 Las Vegas Invitational, a domestic team event, and placed fourth among the ladies to help Team Johnny finish second behind Team Tara.

At the 2021 U.S. Championships, Chen was fourth after the short program due to several under rotations. She placed third in the free skate with only one major mistake on her triple loop. As a result, she earned the bronze medal, her third bronze at the U.S. Championships, and her fifth medal overall. U.S. Figure Skating named gold medalist Bradie Tennell and Chen to the 2021 World Championships team, bypassing silver medalist Amber Glenn for Chen.

In March at the 2021 World Championships, Chen skated two solid programs and placed fourth. She was fourth in the short program and sixth in the free skate. Her placement, combined with Tennell's ninth-place finish, earned the United States three spots for the 2022 World Championships, as well as the opportunity to secure three spots for ladies' singles at the 2022 Winter Olympics via the Olympic qualifying event. Chen's role in saving the third American ladies' spot paralleled her performance at the 2017 World Championships, where she also placed fourth to help secure three spots for the 2018 Winter Olympics.

Chen then competed at the 2021 World Team Trophy, where she finished sixth in both segments to help Team USA win the silver medal.

2021–22 season: Beijing Olympics 
Chen began the season at the 2021 CS Autumn Classic International, where she unexpectedly finished off the podium in fourth place, behind Cypriot Marilena Kitromilis and South Koreans You Young and Ji Seo-yeon. In light of the jump errors in both programs, she vowed to "continue to work on my consistency." At her second Challenger event of the season, the 2021 CS Finlandia Trophy, Chen placed sixth.

Assigned to begin the Grand Prix at the 2021 Skate Canada International, Chen was sixth in the short program. She was tenth in the free skate after falling twice and having several jumps called underrotated, and she dropped to tenth place overall. She said afterward, "practices have been solid, so it's been tough to leave Vancouver with a program like that." At her second Grand Prix event, the 2021 Internationaux de France, she placed fifth overall after ranking fifth in both the short program and the free skate. She reiterated afterward that she was working on translating her improved practices to competition.

Entering the 2022 U.S. Championships hoping to make her second Olympic team, Chen placed second in the short program, narrowly behind Mariah Bell but a few points clear of third-place Alysa Liu, who withdrew before the free skate due to a positive COVID-19 test. Chen was second in the free skate as well despite four underrotated jumps and took the silver medal, the only senior podium placement she had not previously occupied. The following day she was named to the American Olympic team. Chen is the first U.S. women's singles skater since Sasha Cohen in 2002 and 2006 to qualify for back-to-back Olympic teams.

Upon arrival at the 2022 Winter Olympics, Chen was chosen as the American entry for the women's segments of the Olympic team event. With the United States narrowly in the lead after the first three short program segments, Chen skated her short program under significant pressure but faltered, underrotating the second half of her jump combination and falling on an underrotated triple loop. She ranked fifth, four ordinals below Russian skater Kamila Valieva, as a result of which the United States dropped behind the ROC team. Speaking afterward about skating under pressure, Chen remarked "at the end of the day, it's coming from myself. I want to skate well for my team, for myself, my coach, my family, for all these people." However, she said she was pleased that she had recovered well from the fall. She competed again in the free skating portion of the team event, earning 131.52 points for a fourth-place finish, and winning a silver medal with the U.S. team. In the short program of the women's event, Chen made the same error she did in the team event short program, falling on her triple loop attempt, placing thirteenth in the segment. Seventeenth in the free skate with multiple jump errors, she dropped to sixteenth overall.

Days after the Olympics concluded, Vladimir Putin ordered an invasion of Ukraine, as a result of which the International Skating Union banned all Russian and Belarusian skaters from competing at the 2022 World Championships. This had a major impact on the women's field, which Russians dominated for most of the preceding eight years. Chen placed eighth in the short program after singling her triple loop attempt. Eighth in the free skate, Chen also came eighth overall.

Programs

Competitive highlights 
GP: Grand Prix; CS: Challenger Series; JGP: Junior Grand Prix. Pewter medals (4th place) awarded only at U.S. national, sectional, and regional events.

2013–14 to present

Novice level

Detailed results

Senior level

Junior level

References

External links 
 
 Karen Chen at U.S. Figure Skating
 

1999 births
Living people
American female single skaters
American sportspeople of Taiwanese descent
American sportswomen of Chinese descent
People from Fremont, California
21st-century American women
Figure skaters at the 2018 Winter Olympics
Figure skaters at the 2022 Winter Olympics
Olympic silver medalists for the United States in figure skating
Medalists at the 2022 Winter Olympics